The Italian term papello (in ) indicates "a long and detailed paper note, a letter or a complaint" containing indications.

In Italian press since 2000s, the term is referred to the State-Mafia Pact occurred during 1990s. A copy of the papello was consigned to magistrates by Massimo Ciancimino through his lawyer, Francesca Russo, on 15 October 2009.

History

Content
The will of Cosa Nostra, then commanded by Salvatore Riina, went through Vito Ciancimino with twelve requests to the Italian state contained indeed in the papello:

Revision of the Maxi Trial sentence;
Abrogation of Article 41-bis prison regime;
Revision of Rognoni-La Torre law (crime of "associazione di tipo mafioso", mafioso association);
Reform of the law about pentiti;
Recognition of dissociated benefits for mafia convicts;
House arrest for people older than 70 years;
Closure of "super-prisons";
Imprisonment near relatives houses;
No censorship on the relatives correspondences;
Prevention measure and relationship with relatives;
Arrest only in flagrante crime;
Tax exemption for gasoline in Sicily.

See also
State-Mafia Pact

References

History of the Sicilian Mafia